Space Metal is the debut studio album by Arjen Anthony Lucassen's progressive metal project/supergroup Star One, released on the recording label Inside Out in 2002. It was issued in two versions, a standard version containing just the first CD and a limited edition version with more elaborate packaging and both CDs.

The album mixes progressive metal and space rock, and many of the songs are linked conceptually by having cult science fiction movies, novels or TV series as their subjects, mainly adventures on space. The album features a guest vocal performance by Dave Brock of Hawkwind on the track 'Hawkwind Medley'.

Track listing

Album Themes
The themes of the album's songs are based on the following works of fiction:

On CD 1

Set Your Controls – Doctor Who
High Moon – Outland
Songs of the Ocean – Star Trek IV: The Voyage Home
Master of Darkness – The Empire Strikes Back
The Eye of Ra – Stargate
Sandrider – Dune
Perfect Survivor – Alien
Intergalactic Space Crusaders – Blake's 7
Starchild – 2001: A Space Odyssey and 2010

On CD 2
Spaced Out – Dark Star
Inseparable Enemies – Enemy Mine

Personnel

Star One 
Arjen Anthony Lucassen – guitars, keyboards, hammond organ on all tracks
Ed Warby – drums
Russell Allen – vocals
Damian Wilson – vocals
Dan Swanö – vocals
Floor Jansen – vocals

Additional musicians 
 Dave Brock – lead and backing vocals in "Hawkwind Medley"
 Jens Johansson – keyboards
 Erik Norlander – keyboards
 Robert Soeterboek – backing vocals
 Gary Wehrkamp – guitar

Charts

References

External links 
 

2002 albums
Star One albums
Inside Out Music albums